Salman bin Abdulaziz Al Saud (born 31 December 1935) is King of Saudi Arabia, reigning since 2015. He also served as Prime Minister of Saudi Arabia from 2015 to 2022. The 25th son of Ibn Saud, the founder of Saudi Arabia, he assumed the throne on 23 January 2015. Prior to his accession, he was Crown Prince of Saudi Arabia from 16 June 2012 to 23 January 2015. Salman is the 3rd oldest living head of state and the oldest living monarch besides being the country's first head of state born after the unification of Saudi Arabia.

Salman is a son of King Abdulaziz and Hassa bint Ahmed Al Sudairi, making him one of the Sudairi Seven. He was the deputy governor of Riyadh and later the governor of Riyadh for 48 years from 1963 to 2011. He was then appointed minister of defense. He was named crown prince in 2012. Salman became king in 2015 upon the death of his half-brother, King Abdullah. Since December 2019, he is the oldest surviving son of King Abdulaziz.

Salman's major initiatives as king include the Saudi intervention in the Yemeni Civil War, Saudi Vision 2030, and a 2017 decree allowing Saudi women to drive. His son, Crown Prince Mohammed bin Salman, is considered the de facto ruler of Saudi Arabia, due to the King's poor health and his own political maneuvering. Mohammed replaced his father as prime minister in 2022. Salman is regarded by the Royal Islamic Strategic Studies Centre as the most influential Muslim in the world in 2023.

Early life
Salman was born on 31 December 1935, and is reported to be the 25th son of King Abdulaziz, the first monarch and founder of Saudi Arabia. Salman and his six full brothers make up the Sudairi Seven. He was raised in the Murabba Palace.

Salman received his early education at the Princes' School in the capital city of Riyadh, a school established by King Abdulaziz specifically to provide education for his children. He studied religion and modern science.

Riyadh
Salman was appointed deputy governor of Riyadh Province on 17 March 1954, aged 19, and held the post until 19 April 1955. He was appointed the governor of the same provincial on 5 February 1963, and remained in that office until 5 November 2011, a period of almost half a century.

As governor, he contributed to the development of Riyadh from a mid-sized town into a major urban metropolis. He served as an important liaison to attract tourism, capital projects, and foreign investment to his country. He favored political and economic relationships with the West. During his governorship, Salman recruited advisors from King Saud University.

During Salman's five decades as Riyadh governor, he became adept at managing the delicate balance of clerical, tribal, and princely interests that determine Saudi policy. He was also the chairman of the King Abdulaziz Foundation for Research and Archives (KAFRA), King Abdulaziz Museum, the Prince Salman Center for Disability Research and the Prince Fahd bin Salman Charitable Society for the Care of Kidney Patients.

King Salman also undertook several foreign tours while he was governor. In 1974, he visited Kuwait, Bahrain and Qatar to strengthen Saudi Arabia's relationship with those nations. During his visit to Montreal, Canada in 1991, he inaugurated a gallery. In 1996, he was received in the Élysée Palace in Paris by the then-French president Jacques Chirac. The same year he toured Bosnia and Herzegovina to give donations to the Muslim citizens of the country. Being a part of an Asian tour in 1998, Salman visited Pakistan, Japan, Brunei and China.

According to The Washington Post, the late Saudi journalist Jamal Khashoggi "criticized Prince Salman, then governor of Riyadh and head of the Saudi committee for support to the Afghan mujahideen, for unwisely funding Salafist extremist groups that were undermining the war [in Afghanistan against the Soviets]."

Under Salman, Riyadh became one of the richest cities in the Middle East and an important place for trade and commerce. There were also infrastructural advances including schools, universities, and sports stadiums. About the province, he said:

Second in line

On 5 November 2011, Salman was appointed Minister of Defense, replacing his full brother, the Crown Prince Sultan. Sattam bin Abdulaziz was named governor of Riyadh Province. Salman was also named a member of the National Security Council (NSC) on the same day.

It is speculated that he was placed in the immediate line of succession due to his personal qualities. First, he has a conciliatory and diplomatic nature. He headed the family council, called The Descendants' Council (Majlis al Uthra in Arabic), that was established by King Fahd in 2000 to solve family matters, reach consensus and try to avoid any publicly embarrassing behaviour by some family members. Second, Salman belongs to the "middle generation" in the royal family; therefore, he could develop close ties with both generations socially and culturally. Last, as a result of his long-term governorship, he had developed a network of relationships within Arab and international circles.

Salman continued the policy of military intervention in Bahrain. In April 2012, Salman visited both the United States and the United Kingdom where he met with US President Barack Obama and British Prime Minister David Cameron. 2013 saw Saudi military spending climb to $67bn, overtaking that of the UK, France and Japan to place fourth globally. As defense minister, Salman was head of the military as Saudi Arabia joined the United States and other Arab countries in carrying out airstrikes against the Islamic State in Iraq and Syria in 2014.

Crown Prince

On 18 June 2012, Salman was appointed as Crown Prince of Saudi Arabia shortly after the death of his brother, Crown Prince Nayef bin Abdulaziz. Prince Salman was also made First Deputy Prime minister. His nomination as crown prince and deputy prime minister was seen by some as a signal that King Abdullah's cautious reforms were likely to continue. On the other hand, Saudi reformists stated that while Prince Salman, in contrast to other Saudi royals, took a more diplomatic approach towards them, he could not be considered a political reformer. They also argued that, like King Abdullah, Salman focused mainly on economic improvement rather than political change.

On 27 August 2012, the Royal Court announced that Salman was in charge of state affairs whilst King Abdullah was out of the country. Prince Salman launched a Twitter account on 23 February 2013. In September 2012, Salman was named as the deputy chairman of the military service council. He is a strong advocate for philanthropy in poor Muslim nations such as Somalia, Sudan, and Afghanistan.

King of Saudi Arabia

On 23 January 2015, Salman, aged 79, inherited the throne after his half-brother Abdullah died of pneumonia at the age of 90. The new king issued a statement which read "His Highness Salman bin Abdulaziz Al Saud and all members of the family and the nation mourn Custodian of the Two Holy Mosques King Abdullah bin Abdulaziz, who passed away at exactly 1 am this morning." He appointed his younger half-brother, Muqrin bin Abdulaziz, as Crown Prince.

After coming to power, Salman reshuffled the cabinet on 30 January 2015. Khalid bin Ali bin Abdullah al-Humaidan was made the intelligence chief. Prince Bandar bin Sultan was removed from his post in the security council and the adviser to the monarch was also removed as were the former monarch's sons Turki as governor of Riyadh and Mishaal as governor of Mecca. Ali al-Naimi remained the minister of petroleum and mineral resources, as did Saud al-Faisal of the Ministry of Foreign Affairs and Ibrahim Al-Assaf as finance minister. Salman also "gave a bonus of two months' salary to all Saudi state employees and military personnel", including pensioners and students, while also asking citizens to "not forget me in your prayers".

In February 2015, Prince Salman received Charles, Prince of Wales, during his six-day tour in the Middle East. They "exchanged cordial talks and reviewed bilateral relations" between the countries.

In April 2021, Prince Mishaal bin Majid Al Saud, who has been the governor of Jeddah since 1997, was appointed as adviser to King Salman with the rank of minister.

Early reforms
One of the first things the King and his son, Mohammed bin Salman, did was to streamline the government bureaucracy. On the death of King Abdullah, there were as many as eleven government secretariats, and all of these were abolished and reconstituted as only two, the Council of Political and Security Affairs (CPSA), headed by Deputy Crown prince Mohammed bin Nayef, and the Council for Economic and Development Affairs (CEDA), headed by the Secretary-General of the Royal Court, Prince Mohammed bin Salman, who was given free rein to completely reorganize the government and cementing the power of the Sudairi faction, to which both princes belong.

Yemen military intervention

In March 2015, the king ordered the bombing of Yemen and military intervention against the Shia Houthis and forces loyal to former President Ali Abdullah Saleh, who was deposed in the 2011 uprising. He first put together a coalition of ten Sunni Muslim countries. Code-named Operation Decisive Storm, this was the first time the Saudi Air Force had launched airstrikes against another country since the 1990–91 Gulf War.

According to Farea Al-Muslim, direct war crimes have been committed during the conflict; for example, an IDP camp was hit by a Saudi airstrike. Human Rights Watch (HRW) wrote that the Saudi-led air campaign had conducted airstrikes in apparent violation of the laws of war. Human rights groups have also criticized Saudi Arabia for the alleged use of cluster bombs against Yemeni civilians. In 2022, Saudi airstrikes at a prison in Northern Yemen killed at least 70 people and knocked out the country's internet access. The UN estimated that by the end of the year 2021, the death toll of the war on Yemen had reached 377,000 people and could reach 1.3 million people by 2030.

Crown Prince changes
In April 2015, three months after becoming king, Salman appointed a full nephew, Muhammad bin Nayef, as the new Crown Prince to replace his youngest brother Prince Muqrin. Furthermore, he made his son, Mohammed bin Salman, the Deputy Crown Prince. Almost all powers under the king were concentrated in the hands of the crown prince and deputy crown prince, both of whom held the portfolio determining all security and economic development issues in Saudi Arabia.

King Salman then removed Muhammad bin Nayef from the line of succession to the Saudi throne on 21 June 2017 and designated his son Mohammed bin Salman as the new crown prince. At the same time, King Salman removed Muhammad bin Nayef from his other positions in the Saudi government. Mohammad bin Salman has been described as the power behind the throne.

KSRelief
In May 2015, the King Salman Center for Relief and Humanitarian Aid (KSRelief) was established to deliver aid internationally to victims of civil war and natural disaster, working with the UN and other agencies. As of June 2018, KSRelief has implemented more than 400 individual projects in 40 countries at a cost of $1.8 billion. Moreover, in 2018, KSRelief assisted 180,555 Syrian patients living in Zataari Syrian refugees camp in Jordan. In 2019, KSRelief signed a memorandum of cooperation with UNICEF that aims at enhancing cooperation in the humanitarian field, exchanging knowledge, sharing experiences, promoting voluntary work and boosting capacity building programs. Until 2019, the center provided 1,839 Yemeni civilians wounded during the war with prosthetic limbs for a total amount of $2.3 million.

In its ongoing efforts to support the people of Yemen, KSRelief organized a vocational training program to train women in Yemen to enable them to earn money for themselves and their families. In a similar context, under the umbrella of the UN, KSRelief has led an international team to implement a rehabilitation project for the children affected by war in Yemen. Moreover, as part of the 40th session of the UN Human Rights Council, KSRelief organized an event entitled: Children and the Humanitarian Crisis in Yemen where it presented a number of facts and figures related to the amount of assistance provided by the center to the people of Yemen. This includes the implementation of 328 projects for an amount of $2 billion. Furthermore, in 2018 alone, KSRelief provided medical services to 2,501,897 Yemenis.

In 2019, KSRelief signed a number of agreements with different civil society organizations to implement relief projects for the benefit of Palestinian and Syrian refugees as well as the host Lebanese community. KSRelief signed an agreement with the UNHCR to support the families affected by war for an amount of $5 million. Another agreement with IOM was signed to help Syrian refugees under the poverty line for an amount of $3.8 million.

Human rights
In February 2012, Ali Mohammed Baqir al-Nimr was arrested for participating in, and encouraging, pro-democracy protests, when he was 16 or 17 years old. In May 2014, Ali Al-Nimr was sentenced to be executed, despite the minimum age for execution being 18 when a crime is committed. Ali Al-Nimr has reported that he was tortured during his detention. As of 23 September 2015, the sentence awaited ratification by King Salman.

In February 2015, a man from Hafar al-Batin was sentenced to death for rejecting the religion of Islam. In June 2015, Saudi Arabia's Supreme Court upheld the sentence of 1,000 lashes and 10 years in prison for Raif Badawi, a Saudi Arabian blogger who was imprisoned in 2012 after being charged for 'insulting Islam'.

In April 2020, the Saudi Supreme Court stated under a royal decree made by King Salman that minors who commit crimes will no longer face execution, but would be sentenced to imprisonment in a juvenile detention facility for a maximum of 10 years.

Iran and Syria

US Defense Secretary Ashton Carter met with King Salman and his Arabian military counterpart, Deputy Crown Prince Mohammed bin Salman, at Jeddah to answer regional security concerns in the Kingdom and the Gulf states over lifting Iranian economic and conventional military sanctions as the Joint Comprehensive Plan of Action outlines. The King has misgivings over the deal since it would increase the regional power of Iran especially in the proxy conflicts in Syria, Yemen, and elsewhere. In January 2016, Saudi Arabia executed the prominent Saudi Shia cleric Sheikh Nimr. Iran warned that the House of Saud would pay a high price for the execution of Sheikh Nimr by God's will.

Saudi Arabia has emerged as the main group to finance and arm the rebels fighting against the Syrian government. Saudi Arabia openly backed the Army of Conquest, an umbrella rebel group that reportedly included an al-Qaeda linked al-Nusra Front and another Salafi coalition known as Ahrar al-Sham.

In May 2019, leaders of Gulf and Arab states held two emergency summits in Mecca to present a united front to Iran. Salman accused Iran of threatening global oil supplies and shipping at a meeting of Arab leaders that called on the international community to confront Tehran following attacks on shipping and rising tensions in the oil-rich region. Salman said "what the Iranian regime is doing, from intervening in regional countries' affairs and developing its nuclear program, threatening global maritime traffic and global oil supplies, is a blatant violation of the treaties and principles of the United Nations." He urged the international community should "use all means to deter this regime."

Panama Papers revelations

King Salman has been implicated in the Panama Papers leaks, with two companies originating in the British Virgin Islands taking mortgages in excess of US$34 million to purchase property in central London. His role has not been specified. The then-Crown Prince Muhammad bin Nayef has also been named in association with the Papers.

Later reforms
Further government reforms took place in June 2018, when Salman replaced the labor and Islamic affairs ministers. The appointment of businessman Ahmed al-Rajhi as labor minister signalled a growing role for private sector expertise in the Saudi government. The new minister for Islamic affairs, Abdullatif al-Alsheikh, had previously been credited with reining in the power of the religious police. At the same time Salman ordered the establishment of the Ministry of Culture, with responsibility for delivering Saudi Vision 2030's cultural goals; and the Council of Royal Reserves, tasked with environmental protection.

In September 2022, the King resigned from the post of prime minister, handing this role to his son Mohammed.

Influence
 
Salman was often a mediator in settling royal conflicts among the extended Al Saud family – estimated at 4,000 princes. He was a prominent figure of the royal council, which allowed him to select which princes would be delegated which responsibilities of the Kingdom.

Salman and his family own a media group, including pan-Arab daily Asharq Al-Awsat and Al Eqtisadiah. Though he owns only ten percent of the Saudi Research and Marketing Group (SRMG), he is often referred by auditors as its owner. He reportedly controlled the organization through his son Prince Faisal, who is a former chairman of the concern.  The SRMG publishes such daily papers as Arab News, Asharq Al-Awsat and Al Eqtisadiah through its subsidiary Saudi Research and Publishing Company (SRPC).

In a similar vein, Salman is reported to have some strong alliances with significant journalists. He is said to be close to Al Arabiya TV director and Asharq Al-Awsat journalist Abdelrahman Al Rashid and to Othman Al Omeir, who launched and is the owner of the liberal e-newspaper Elaph. King Salman is thought to have connections with the Elaph website.

Views

Salman holds traditional views with regard to political reforms and social change. In November 2002, in reference to charitable organizations accused of terrorism (e.g. al-Haramain Foundation, Saudi High Commission for Relief of Bosnia and Herzegovina), he stated that he had personally taken part in the activities of such organizations, but added "I know the assistance goes to doing good. But if there are those who change some work of charity into evil activities, then it is not the Kingdom's responsibility, nor its people, which helps its Arab and Muslim brothers around the world."

Al Jazeera referred to Salman's views reported in a 2007 US diplomatic cable. Salman said that "the pace and extent of reforms depend on social and cultural factors, ... that for social reasons—not [religious] reasons—reforms cannot be imposed by the [Saudi government] or there will be negative reactions, ... [and] that changes have to be introduced in a sensitive and timely manner." According to the cable, he said that "democracy should not be imposed" in Saudi Arabia, since the country "is composed of tribes and regions and if democracy were imposed, each tribe and region would have its political party."

Personal life

Marriages and issue
Salman bin Abdulaziz has been married three times and has fathered at least thirteen children, including twelve sons. 

Salman's first wife was his first cousin, Sultana bint Turki Al Sudairi, daughter of his maternal uncle, Turki bin Ahmad Al Sudairi, a former governor of Asir Province. They were married in 1954, when Salman was only 18 years old. Sultana bore the king six children, including his only known daughter. The couple were fated to endure the deaths of two grown sons. She died on 30 July 2011. The couple's children were:

Prince Fahd (1955–2001). Salman was only 19 years old when he became a father with the birth of Fahd in 1955. Fahd married a cousin and was the father of four children. A businessman and horse-breeder, he died of heart failure aged 47 in July 2001. After his death, his respected mother extended generous patronage in his memory to an existing, struggling charity, which then renamed itself The Prince Fahd bin Salman Charitable Society for the Care of Kidney Patients. Fahd's brother Abdulaziz has taken over patronage of that charity after the demise of their mother.
Prince Sultan (born 1956). He became the first person of royal blood, the first Arab and first Muslim to fly to outer space when he flew aboard the Space Shuttle Discovery (STS-51-G) in June 1985. Sultan bin Salman is currently the chairman of the Saudi Space Commission. Prince Sultan bin Salman was formerly the chairman of the Saudi Commission for Tourism and Antiquities (SCTA), which later was changed to be the Ministry of Tourism. 
Prince Ahmed (1958–2002), died of a heart attack in July 2002 aged 43.
Prince Abdulaziz (b. 1960). He has been the deputy minister of oil since 1995, then the minister of Energy since 2019.
Prince Faisal (b. 1970). He is the governor of Madinah province.
Princess Hassa (b. 1974), Salman's only known daughter. On 28 May 2021, she was married to a cousin, Fahd bin Saad Al Saud, at the Royal Sea Place in Jeddah.

Salman's second wife was Sarah bint Faisal Al Subai'ai. The couple are divorced. The relatively brief marriage produced one son:
Prince Saud (b. 1986).

Salman's third wife is Fahda bint Falah Al Hithlain, grand-daughter of Rakan bin Hithlain and great-granddaughter of Dhaydan bin Hithlain, leaders of the Al Ajman tribe. She has borne the king six sons, being:
Prince Mohammed (b. 1985), Crown Prince of Saudi Arabia. He was Salman's private adviser at the Ministry of Defense and at the Crown Prince Court. Upon Salman's accession to the throne in January 2015, he was appointed minister of defense and head of the royal court. Later he was named crown prince.
Prince Turki (b. 1987). He became the chairman of the Saudi Research and Marketing Group in February 2013, replacing his elder half-brother Faisal.
Prince Khalid (b. 1988)
Prince Nayef 
Prince Bandar
Prince Rakan

Personality
Salman was the closest brother to Crown Prince Sultan, having remained at his side during his constant illness and recovery in New York and Morocco, from 2008 to 2011. Prince Sultan described him as "the prince of loyalty" in a letter sent to him. Salman was also King Fahd's most trusted adviser during his reign.

His legal counsel was William Jeffress Jr., of U.S.-based firm Baker Botts LLP, in a lawsuit filed by families of victims of the September 11 attacks from 2002 to 2010.

In August 2010, Salman underwent spinal surgery in the United States and remained out of the kingdom for recovery. He has had one stroke and, despite receiving physiotherapy, his left arm does not work as well as his right. Salman also has mild vascular dementia, specifically Alzheimer's.

U.S. intelligence officials believe that King Salman has been kept apart from his wife Princess Fahda bint Falah Al Hithlain for several years, on the orders of their son Prince Mohammed bin Salman. The officials interviewed said the prince placed his mother under house arrest without the king's knowledge. She had not been involved in any public events between 2015 and the early 2020, but she reappeared at such events from March 2020.

Salman received the Lifetime Achievement Award of the Al-Turath Charity Foundation in the field of urban heritage in 2013. In 2017, Salman pledged US$15,000,000 for Rohingya Muslim refugees in Bangladesh.

In July 2020, King Salman underwent successful gallbladder surgery.

Honours 
  : 
 Collar of the Order of Sheikh Isa bin Salman Al Khalifa (2017)
  : 
 Royal Family Order of the Crown of Brunei (D.K.M.B.) (2017)
  : 
 Grand Cordon of the Order of National Star of Djibouti (2015)
  : 
 Collar of the Order of the Nile (2016)
  : 
 Grand Cordon of the National Order of Merit (2015)
  : 
 First Class of the Star of the Republic of Indonesia (2017)
  : 
 Grand Cordon of the Order of the Chrysanthemum (2017)
  : 
 Collar of the Order of Al-Hussein bin Ali (2017)
  : 
 Collar of the Order of Mubarak the Great (2016)
 Collar of the Order of Kuwait (2016)
  : 
 Honorary Commander of the Order of the Defender of the Realm (P.M.N.) (1982)
 Recipient of the Most Exalted Order of the Crown of the Realm (D.M.N.) (2017)
  : 
 Collar of the Order of the Aztec Eagle (2016)
  : 
 Grand Cordon of the Order of Ouissam Alaouite (1987)
 Collar of the Order of Muhammad (2016)
  : 
  : 
  First Class of the Nishan-e-Pakistan (2015)
 :
  Grand Cordon with Collar of the Order of Al-Said (2021)
 : 
 Grand Collar of the State of Palestine (2015)
  : 
 Grand Cross of the National Order of the Lion (2015)
  : 
 Collar of the Order of the Republic (2017)
  : 
 Grand Cross of the Order of Good Hope (2016)
  : 
 Grand Cross of the Order of Civil Merit (1974)
  : 
 Grand Cordon of the Order of the Republic (2019)
  : 
 Collar of the Order of the State of Republic of Turkey (2016)
  : 
 Grand Cordon of the Order of the Republic (2001)
  : 
 Collar of the Order of Zayed (2016)
  : 
 Collar of the Order of Prince Yaroslav the Wise (2017)
  :
 Grand Collar of the Order of the Golden Eagle (2022)

See also
 List of rulers of Saudi Arabia
 List of things named after Saudi Kings
 Succession to the Saudi Arabian throne

References

External links
 
 "Shifting Sands and the Gulf" on Sulayman's transition as King
 "King Salman Royal Profile" by Royal Families of the World
 

|-

|-

|-

|-

1935 births
20th-century Saudi Arabian politicians
Salman
Salman
Salman
Grand Cross of the Order of Civil Merit
Living people
People named in the Panama Papers
Salman
Recipients of the Order of Prince Yaroslav the Wise, 1st class
Recipients of the Order of the Defender of the Realm
Recipients of the Order of the Crown of the Realm
Salman
Salman
Recipients of Grand Collar of the State of Palestine
Defense ministers of Saudi Arabia